The Myanmar national futsal team is controlled by the Myanmar Football Federation, the governing body for futsal in Myanmar and represents the country in international futsal competitions.

Tournaments

FIFA Futsal World Cup

AFC Futsal Championship

AFF Futsal Championship

*Denotes draws include knockout matches decided on penalty kicks.
**Red border color indicates tournament was held on home soil.

Recent Matches

2013

Players

Current squad 
The following players were named for 2018 AFC Futsal Championship.

Previous squads

AFC Futsal Championship
2018 AFC Futsal Championship squads

See also
Myanmar national football team
Myanmar national beach soccer team
Myanmar women's national football team

References

Myanmar
F
Futsal in Myanmar